Columnea flexiflora is a threatened species of plant from Ecuador.

References

flexiflora
Endangered plants